Sun Java System Access Manager is Sun Microsystems' web access management product and a component of Sun Java Enterprise System. Sun Java System Access Manager provides single sign-on, federation and secure Web service functionality.

See also
OpenSSO

External links 
 Sun Java System Access Manager- Official product page
 Application Integration: Sun Java System Access Manager 2004Q2 and JDBC Authentication Module

Java enterprise platform
Sun Microsystems software
Federated identity